Manikut (literally "the jewel hut") is an independent room located towards the eastern end of an Ekasarana Hindu prayer house (namghar). It is the place that represents the worshipful god, or a guru asana (the guru's seat). It is also called a bhajghar in western Assam, with its own roof. This is the only place in a namghar that is fully walled, with or without any windows. The manikut is a later addition attached to the basic namghar structure. The place does not house any idols as idolatry was denounced by Shankardev.

Guru asana

The Guru Āsana, literally the Seat of the Guru, is the place of sacred scripture. It is a seven-tiered, triangular, wooden throne adorned with tortoise-elephant-lion motifs and other decorative woodwork.

Culture of Assam
Ekasarana Dharma
Religious buildings and structures in Assam